Eversley Augustus Linley (born 1 November 1969) is a retired sprinter from Saint Vincent and the Grenadines who specialized in the 400 metres and the 800 metres.

He participated in the 800 metres at the 1988 and 1992 Olympics, and in the 4 x 400 metres relay at the 1992 and 1996 Olympics.

His personal best times are 46.55 seconds in the 400 metres, achieved in 1992, and 1:48.58 minutes in the 800 metres, achieved in 1992 (indoor). He holds the national record in 4 x 400 metres relay with 3:06.52 minutes, achieved with teammates Eswort Coombs, Thomas Dickson and Erasto Sampson during the heats at the 1996 Summer Olympics.

References

1969 births
Living people
Saint Vincent and the Grenadines male sprinters
Saint Vincent and the Grenadines male middle-distance runners
Athletes (track and field) at the 1988 Summer Olympics
Athletes (track and field) at the 1992 Summer Olympics
Athletes (track and field) at the 1996 Summer Olympics
Olympic athletes of Saint Vincent and the Grenadines
Athletes (track and field) at the 1991 Pan American Games
Pan American Games competitors for Saint Vincent and the Grenadines